Michael K. Haggerty (born October 14, 1945) is a former American football offensive tackle who played six seasons in the National Football League (NFL) with the Pittsburgh Steelers, New England Patriots and Detroit Lions. He was drafted by the  Steelers in the sixth round of the 1967 NFL Draft. Haggerty played college football at the University of Miami and attended Shrine Catholic High School in Royal Oak, Michigan. He was also a member of the Jacksonville Sharks/Express of the World Football League (WFL).

References

External links
Just Sports Stats

Living people
1945 births
Players of American football from Michigan
American football offensive tackles
Miami Hurricanes football players
Pittsburgh Steelers players
New England Patriots players
Detroit Lions players
Jacksonville Sharks (WFL) players
Sportspeople from Royal Oak, Michigan